The 1995 FIS Ski Jumping Grand Prix was the 2nd Summer Grand Prix season in ski jumping on plastic. Season began on 19 August 1995 in Kuopio, Finland and ended on 3 September 1995 in Stams, Austria.

Other competitive circuits this season included the World Cup and Continental Cup.

Calendar

Men

Standings

Overall

References

Grand Prix
FIS Grand Prix Ski Jumping